Bamu Rural LLG is a local-level government (LLG) of Western Province, Papua New Guinea. The Kamula language is spoken in the LLG, near the Wawoi Falls area.

Wards
01. Samakopa (Kamula language speakers)
02. Kawalasi
03. Kamusi
04. Parieme
05. Bibisa (Foia Foia language speakers)
06. Gagori
07. Iowa
08. Garu
09. Miruwo
10. Wakau/Sogere
11. Asaramio
12. Bina
13. Sisiam
14. Torobina
15. Bamio
16. Pirupiru
17. Ukusi
18. Nemeti
19. Ibuo

See also
Bamu River
Wawoi River

References

Local-level governments of Western Province (Papua New Guinea)